Louis de Guiringaud (12 October 1911 – 15 April 1982) was a French politician who served as Minister of Foreign Affairs under Raymond Barre between 1976 and 1978. Previous to his appointment as a French Minister, Guiringuaud served as France's permanent representative to the UN from 1972 to 1976, also presiding as a member of the United Nations Security Council.

Guiringaud shot himself on 15 April 1982.

References

1911 births
1982 deaths
People from Limoges
French Foreign Ministers
French politicians who committed suicide
Permanent Representatives of France to the United Nations
Ambassadors of France to Japan
Suicides by firearm in France
Ambassadors of France to Ghana